Many a Mile is the sixteenth studio album by Canadian country rock band Blue Rodeo, released on December 3, 2021.

Track listing

Personnel 
Credits adapted from album's liner notes.

 Greg Keelor – lead and harmony vocals, electric guitar
 Jim Cuddy – lead and harmony vocals, acoustic guitar
 Bazil Donovan – bass guitar
 Glenn Milchem – drums
 Colin Cripps – electric and acoustic guitars, harmony vocals
 Michael Boguski – piano, organ, synthesizer, synthesizer strings, electric piano, Wurlitzer, Hammond organ, Ace Tone keyboard
 Jimmy Bowskill – mandolin, pedal steel guitar, electric and acoustic guitars, Fender Bass VI, banjo, Weissenborn guitar, harmony vocals

Guest musicians/personnel

 Brittany Brooks – harmony vocals 
 James McKenty – electric and acoustic guitars 
 Ian McKeown – tambourine 
 Melissa Payne – harmony vocals 
 Tim Vesely – percussion

Charts

References 

Blue Rodeo albums
2021 albums